Kekaha Kai State Park, formerly known as Kona Coast State Park, is a beach park located along the north Kona coast on the island of Hawaii. The main beach areas are Maniniowali Bay (Kua Bay), Makalawena beach at Puu Alii Bay, and Mahaiula Bay. The park's name originates from the Hawaiian language words ke kaha kai which translate to "the shore line" in English.

Park sections
The northern section of the park is on Maniniowali Bay located at coordinates . This beach area is popularly called Kua Bay since it is easier to pronounce.

The wetland area behind Makalawena beach was designated a National Natural Landmark in 1972. The marsh is known as Ōpaeula Pond (Hawaiian for "red shrimp") and was the site of a small fishing village that was wiped out in the 1946 tsunami. The  of wetland provide one of the last remaining nesting grounds of the āeo (Hawaiian stilt, Himantopus mexicanus knudseni), the alae keokeo (Hawaiian coot, Fulica alai), and the only known breeding area for the aukuu (black-crowned night heron, Nycticorax nycticorax hoactli) in Hawaii. The pond is located at coordinates  in the privately owned area between the two sections of the state park.

Mahaiula Bay is accessed by an unpaved lava road which heads west off the main highway a short distance north of the airport. The Mahaiula section is located at coordinates  and has a sandy beach with a picnic area.

A  section of the historic Ala Kahakai coastal trail connects Mahaiula and Kua Bay. A hike up Puu Kuili offers a wide view of the coastline from the summit of the  cinder cone.

The park is open daily from 8:00 am – 7:00 pm.

External links
 Hawaii-Guide.com
 TripAdvisor.com

References

Beaches of Hawaii (island)
State parks of Hawaii
Protected areas of Hawaii (island)
Wetlands of Hawaii
Landforms of Hawaii (island)
National Natural Landmarks in Hawaii